Europos Centro Golf Club is a golf club and course in Girija, Vilnius District Municipality.

The Golf Club was established in 2005 next to the Geographical midpoint of Europe. During the winter the golf club becomes a 5 km cross-country skiing track.

References

External links 
 Official website

2005 establishments in Lithuania
Golf clubs and courses in Lithuania